Tsalada is a rural locality (a selo) in Tlogobsky Selsoviet, Gunibsky District, Republic of Dagestan, Russia. The population was 207 as of 2010.

Geography 
Tsalada is located 42 km northwest of Gunib (the district's administrative centre) by road, on the Kunada River. Gazilala and Kuyada are the nearest rural localities.

Nationalities 
Avars live there.

References 

Rural localities in Gunibsky District